The 2010–11 Belarusian Extraliga season was the 19th season of the Belarusian Extraliga, the top level of ice hockey in Belarus. 12 teams participated in the league, and Yunost Minsk won the championship.

Regular season

Playoffs
Quarterfinals
Yunost Minsk - HK Brest 3-1 on series.
HK Shakhtor Soligorsk - HK Gomel 3-2 on series.
HK Neman Grodno - HK Sokil Kiev 3-0 in series.
Metallurg Zhlobin - HK Liepājas Metalurgs 3-0 on series.
Semifinals
Yunost Minsk - HK Shakhtor Soligorsk 3-0 on series.
HK Neman Grodno - Metallurg Zhlobin 3-0 on series.
Final
Yunost Minsk - HK Neman Grodno 4-2 on series.

External links 
 Season on hockeyarchives.info

Belarusian Extraleague
Belarusian Extraleague seasons
Extraleague